The Kootenai National Forest is a national forest located in the far northwestern section of Montana and the northeasternmost lands in the Idaho panhandle in the United States, along the Canada–US border. Of the  administered by the forest, less than 3 percent is located in the state of Idaho. Forest headquarters are located in Libby, Montana. There are local ranger district offices in Eureka, Fortine, Libby, Trout Creek, and Troy, Montana. About 53 percent of the  Cabinet Mountains Wilderness is located within the forest, with the balance lying in neighboring Kaniksu National Forest.

Mountain ranges included in the forest include the Whitefish, Purcell, Bitterroot, Salish, and Cabinet ranges.

The Pacific Northwest National Scenic Trail traverses the Forest.

The Kootenai and the Clark Fork rivers are the major rivers and are fed by abundant rainfall that is more than double that amount found elsewhere in Montana. Three major hydroelectric dams exist in the Kootenai National Forest. Libby Dam on the Kootenai River creates a -long lake known as Lake Koocanusa (a play on Kootenai-Canada-United States of America), which extends into Canada. The shores of the lake are all forested with no private property easements. Other rivers in the forest include the Yaak, Fisher, Tobacco and Vermillion, with water flowing from over 100 lakes.

The climate of the Kootenai has been described as "modified Pacific maritime" in character, meaning that compared to the remainder of Montana, this area's climate resembles that found along the Pacific coast. Winters also feature heavy snowfalls in the mountains. 

Access into the forest is via U.S. Highway 2, U.S. Highway 93, and Montana State Highways 37, 56, 200, and 508.

The national forest is located overwhelmingly (almost 95 percent) in Lincoln County, Montana, but extends into neighboring counties. In descending order of forestland area, they are Flathead County in Montana, Bonner and Boundary counties in Idaho, and Sanders County in Montana.

See also
 Gibralter Fire
 List of forests in Montana

References

External links 

 
 
 

 
National Forests of Idaho
National Forests of Montana
National Forests of the Rocky Mountains
Protected areas established in 1907
Protected areas of Lincoln County, Montana
Protected areas of Flathead County, Montana
Protected areas of Sanders County, Montana
Protected areas of Bonner County, Idaho
Protected areas of Boundary County, Idaho
1907 establishments in Montana